World's Scariest Police Chases is an action driving video game developed by Swedish company Unique Development Studios (sv) and published by Activision for the PlayStation in June 2001. It is a video game adaptation of a television show of the same name but later renamed to World's Wildest Police Videos.

Reception

The game received "mixed" reviews according to the review aggregation website Metacritic. Daniel Erickson of NextGen, however, said, "Never has a television show been translated so perfectly into a videogame – exciting, over-the-top, and just a little on the silly side."

References

External links
 
 

2001 video games
Activision games
Organized crime video games
PlayStation (console) games
PlayStation (console)-only games
Racing video games
Unique Development Studios games
Video games about police officers
Video games based on television series
Video games developed in Sweden
Video games set in the United States